Churrería El Moro is a restaurant serving churros and hot chocolate in Mexico City. The original  1935 location is on Eje Central Lázaro Cárdenas near the Metro San Juan de Letrán in the Historic center of Mexico City. Since 2014 the grandchildren of the original owner have opened branches in Palacio de Hierro department store food halls (Polanco, Perisur, Centro Santa Fe), in the Mercado Roma food hall, on Parque México in Condesa, on Avenida Álvaro Obregón in Colonia Roma, and in Colonia Cuauhtémoc along Río Lerma street, a restaurant row.

References

Fast-food restaurants
Restaurants in Mexico City
1935 establishments in Mexico